Sandro Porceddu is a head and neck radiation oncologist at Brisbane's Princess Alexandra Hospital and a Professor with the University of Queensland. He was president of the Clinical Oncologic Society of Australia (COSA) and chair of the Trials Scientific Committee of the Trans Tasman Radiation Oncology Group (TROG).

Academic career
Porceddu was awarded a doctorate of medicine for his research into improving the integration of radiotherapy in the management of head and neck cancer and received the American Head and Neck Society/ANZ Head and Neck Cancer Society Christopher O’Brien Traveling Scholarship. He is chair of a phase 3 clinical trial group to assess radiation therapy alone versus in combination with carboplatin chemotherapy for the post-operative treatment of head and neck cancers.

Publications

References

Year of birth missing (living people)
Living people
Australian oncologists
Academic staff of the University of Queensland